A Royal Christmas is a 2014 American holiday romance television film directed by Alex Zamm and starring Lacey Chabert, Stephen Hagan, and Jane Seymour. Written by Janeen Damian, Michael Damian, Neal H. Dobrofsky, and Tippi Dobrofsky, the film is about a young American seamstress from Philadelphia whose boyfriend reveals himself to be a royal prince and heir to the throne of Cordinia. He brings her to his country intending to marry her, to the consternation of the Queen. A Royal Christmas is an original Hallmark Channel movie and first aired on the Hallmark Channel on November 21, 2014.

Plot
Emily Taylor (Lacey Chabert) is a humble and kindhearted seamstress devoted to her family's business in Philadelphia. She is also in love with her European boyfriend Leo James (Stephen Hagan). As the Christmas season approaches, Leo reveals that he is in fact Prince Leopold, heir to the throne of a small sovereign country called Cordinia, which is loosely based on Monaco (but amalgamates the place names, Corsica and Sardinia). He takes Emily back to his country for the Christmas holidays and introduces her to his mother Isadora, Queen of Cordinia (Jane Seymour), who disapproves of the young American immediately. Wanting her son to marry a duchess named Natasha—Leo's ex-girlfriend—whom she finds more suitable than a commoner, the Queen goes out of her way to make Emily feel unwelcome at their castle.

Emily tries to adapt to her new royal surroundings, but feels more comfortable with the castle's butlers and housemaids than she does with her boyfriend's royal family and friends. While in town with Leopold buying Christmas Trees, Emily befriends Poppy, a little orphan girl.  Emily is then befriended by Galina, the Baroness of Newbury who she later finds out used to be a commoner like herself.  Galina also takes to Poppy right away.  The conflict comes to a head when the scheming Queen secretly invites the duchess to the castle for Christmas. With the help of the head butler Victor (Simon Dutton), Emily is schooled in etiquette and then makes a grand entrance at the Christmas ball in a dress she designed herself out of the Queen's old gown. Her happiness is cut short, however, when the Queen discovers her talking with two of the kitchen staff whom she fires immediately. Later, when Leo proposes marriage, Emily, realizing she doesn't fit in, turns down his offer and returns to America.

Sometime later, the Queen realizes all the hurt she's caused and remembers her feelings of love for Victor, whose love she rejected years earlier because he was a commoner. Looking to make up for the hurt that she caused, the Queen accompanies her son and Victor to Philadelphia and watches as Leo proposes once again—and this time Emily accepts.  The movie ends with Leopold and Emily's wedding with Poppy in attendance with the Baron and Baroness of Newbury who have presumably adopted her.

Cast
 Lacey Chabert as Emily Taylor
 Stephen Hagan as Leo James/Prince Leopold
 Jane Seymour as Isadora, Queen of Cordinia
 Katherine Flynn as Natasha, Duchess of Warren
 Simon Dutton as Victor
 Mitchell Mullen as Bud Taylor
 Katrina Nare as Toni
 Diana Dumitrescu as Olivia
 Vlad Ianus as Will
 Kate Loustau as Galina, Baroness of Newbury
 Ionut Grama as Kent, Baron of Newbury
 Alice O'Mahoney as Poppy
 Annie Gould as Sister Agatha
 Mihai Niculescu as Grand Duke of Canterbury
 Olivia Krevoy as Teenage Girl

Production
A Royal Christmas was filmed on location around Sighisoara, Romania.

Release
A Royal Christmas first aired on Hallmark Channel on November 21, 2014.

Critical response
In her review for The Hollywood Reporter, Allison Keene gave the film a positive review and found the cast—especially Lacey Chabert and Jane Seymour—all "natural and likable". Keene continued:

Keene concluded that the film is "one part Cinderella, two parts The Princess Diaries, a dash of Wills and Kate, and a pinch of 'win a trip to Downton Abbey'".

References

External links
 
 

2014 television films
2014 films
2010s romance films
American Christmas films
American romance films
Hallmark Channel original films
2010s Christmas films
Films directed by Alex Zamm
Films set in Europe
Films about royalty
Films set in Philadelphia
Films set in a fictional country
Films shot in Bucharest
2010s English-language films
2010s American films